S. K. Senthivel is a Sri Lankan political activist. He has been guiding the New-Democratic Marxist-Leninist Party as the General Secretary since 1989.

Early life 
Sinnathamby Kasipillai Senthivel was born in Sirrupiddy near Puttur, Sri Lanka. He studied at Sri Somaskanda College.

Politics 
He was inspired by public opinion at an early age and began to act as a Marxist. At the age of 21 he became full time worker for Ceylon Communist Party (Maoist) in 1964 and participated in the 1966 October 21 Uprising against Untouchability in Jaffna. He subsequently took part in a number of mass struggles and written many books in Tamil.

Works 
In 1988, he co-authored Caste and its struggles in Sri Lanka with Dr. Nadesan Raveendran. In 1994, he wrote a book on sociology, human beings and social life. Subsequently in 2003, he wrote a biography of Communist M. Karthikeyan and the Northern Left Movement. Following in 2014, he wrote about K. A. Subramaniam the founder of the New-Democratic Marxist-Leninist Party on his 25th anniversary.

References

1943 births
Living people
Sri Lankan political people
Sri Lankan communists
Sri Lankan Tamil activists
People from British Ceylon